Stefan Fićović (born 31 May 1998) is a Serbian footballer who plays for Metalac Gornji Milanovac, in the Serbian First League.

Career statistics

References

External links
 
 
 

1998 births
Living people
Association football midfielders
Serbian footballers
FK Borac Čačak players
Serbian First League players